Bruguera is a Catalan surname. It may refer to:

Editorial Bruguera, a Spanish publishing company
Josep Llimona i Bruguera (1864–1934), Catalan sculptor
Miguel Brugueras (1939-2006), Cuban politician and diplomat
Sergi Bruguera (born 1971), Spanish tennis player
Tania Bruguera (born 1968), Cuban artist

See also
 Brugnera, a comune in the Province of Pordenone, Italy
 Bruguiera, a plant genus in the family Rhizophoraceae

Catalan-language surnames